Nicole Manzone-Saquet is a Monegasque politician and a president of the Union of Monegasque Women. From 2008 until 2013 Manzone-Saquet was a member of the National Council of Monaco from Union Monegasque (Union Des Monégasques).

Career 
Since 1988 Manzone-Saquet is a president of the Union of Monegasque Women (Union des Femmes Monégasques). She is a women's rights activist; however, she doesn't consider herself a feminist. Manzone-Saquet notes that such developments as the termination of pregnancy for medical reasons, divorce by mutual consent, parental leave and part-time work were achieved thank to the involvement of women in the National Council.

From 2008 until 2013 Manzone-Saquet was a member of the National Council of Monaco from Union Monegasque (Union Des Monégasques). She was the oldest female member of the National Council. Manzone-Saquet chaired the Commission on Women's and Family Rights. In 2011–2013, Manzone-Saquet was a Representative of Monaco in the Parliamentary Assembly of the Council of Europe.

References 

Monegasque women in politics
Year of birth missing (living people)
Members of the National Council (Monaco)
Living people
21st-century women politicians